Johnny Matthews (born 5 July 1993) is a Scotland 'A' international rugby union player who plays for Glasgow Warriors. His usual position is at the Hooker position.

Rugby Union career

Amateur career

Matthews played for Sedgley Park in the season 2016–17. He scored 26 tries in 29 appearances. While with Yorkshire Carnegie he played for Otley.

On moving to Scotland in 2017 Matthews played for Boroughmuir. He finished the Scottish Premiership's top try scorer for 2018–19 season.

Professional career

From Sedgley Park, Matthews moved to Yorkshire Carnegie. He then played for Sale Jets, the Sale Sharks 2XV.

Matthews was a back-up player for Edinburgh.

It was announced on 6 September that Matthews had signed a professional contract with Glasgow Warriors for short-term cover over the 2019 Rugby World Cup; when Glasgow lose around 15 of their players to the national squads involved in the tournament.

Matthews said of the Warriors move: "I’m absolutely delighted to sign. Glasgow is one of the biggest clubs in Europe and I’m looking forward to hopefully getting a few games under my belt while I’m here."

Matthews made his debut for Glasgow Warriors in their opening match of the 2019-20 season - against Ulster at Kingspan Stadium, Belfast on 7 September 2019.

Matthews scored his first try for the club in the return match in a 36–33 victory at Scotstoun Stadium.

On 29 November 2019 it was confirmed that Matthews' Glasgow Warriors contract will be extended to the rest of the 2019–20 season.

International career

Matthews is Scottish-qualified as his mother is from Glasgow. He has represented Scotland at Under 18 and at Club XV levels.

He was called up to the Scotland squad for the 2022 summer tour on 17 June 2022.

He was capped by Scotland 'A' on 25 June 2022 in their match against Chile.

Administrative career

Matthews studied Sports Marketing at Leeds Beckett University.

He was a Rugby Development Officer at North Berwick RFC from 2017 to 2018.

Matthews was the Commercial and Community Development Manager at Boroughmuir from 2018 to 2019.

On 19 January 2022, Matthews took the position of Commercial Manager of Watsonians.

References

External links 

 Youtube highlights

1993 births
Living people
Scottish rugby union players
Rugby union hookers
Boroughmuir RFC players
Scotland Club XV international rugby union players
Otley R.U.F.C. players
Glasgow Warriors players
Rotherham Titans players
Leeds Tykes players
Rugby union players from Liverpool
Scotland 'A' international rugby union players